Alex Hyde-White (born 30 January 1959) is an American film and television actor. In 1978, he signed with Universal Pictures as one of the last "contract players" in Hollywood, in a group that included Lindsay Wagner, Andrew Stevens, Gretchen Corbett and Sharon Gless.

Early life 
Hyde-White was born in London, the son of Ethel M. (née Korenman), a stage manager who acted under the name Ethel Drew, and actor Wilfrid Hyde-White. Known as Punch to friends, he grew up in Palm Springs, California, attending Palm Springs High School and Georgetown University in Washington, D.C. for one year after which he left to pursue an acting career.

Career 
Under contract to Universal Pictures at age 18, his first television job was one line – "leave my mother alone" – spoken to star Jack Klugman on the television series Quincy M.E. He recurred in several episodes, each time as a different character and also made numerous appearances in Battlestar Galactica and later Buck Rogers in the 25th Century which also featured his father Wilfrid. The only time both father and son appeared on screen together was on The Merv Griffin Show in 1980. A clip from that show is featured in his film Three Days of Hamlet.

In 1994 he played the Marvel Comics superhero Reed Richards, a.k.a. Mister Fantastic, in a motion picture adaptation of Marvel's flagship comics series The Fantastic Four. The film was low budget and made by certain parties in order to retain the film rights to the property; it was never released. Bootleg copies of the film made the rounds, and the film has acquired its own following. Hyde-White is regarded by many comics fans as the best embodiment of the character so far, who has since been played by Ioan Gruffudd, Miles Teller and John Krasinski.

Through his production company TMG, named after his mentor, Washington attorney Steven Martindale, he produced the 2002 independent romantic drama Pursuit of Happiness, which starred Frank Whaley, Annabeth Gish, Adam Baldwin and featured Jean Stapleton in a cameo as the advertising agency's owner. Stapleton's son John Putch was the director. Putch had directed Alex previously in Deep Water and in Murder 101 for Hallmark. Alex has worked with Steven Spielberg three times, Indiana Jones and the Last Crusade as Young Henry Jones, Sr. and Catch Me If You Can as Dick Kesner, the divorce lawyer, and “Tintin”. But he's probably most recognized as the charming polo-playing son of Ralph Bellamy in the blockbuster hit Pretty Woman, whose company is being taken-over by Richard Gere: Alex's friendship with Julia Roberts' character is the first time Gere gets noticeably jealous, bringing their romance to another level.

Projects 
Hyde-White directed the TMG production Three Days, from Universal City-based Ytinifni Pictures, headed by David Suarez. Also starring Peter Woodward, Richard Chamberlain and Stefanie Powers, the experimental first-person documentary follows a troupe of actors who gather for three days to rehearse and perform a reading of Shakespeare's Hamlet. The film won Best Documentary at three festivals, International Family Film Festival (Hollywood, Spring 2012), L-Dub (Lake Worth, FL, Fall 2012), and Eugene Int'l Film Festival (Oregon, Fall 2012).

His production company, TMG, is developing a few projects for both the big and small screen. One is the existentialist crime novel King of Infinite Space with the book's author Tyler Dilts, as an independent film. Screenwriter Peter Woodward is adapting the novel. The film is called Signal Hill. It is the first in the Danny Beckett series from Long Beach State professor Dilts. Another is Printer of Udell's based on the early 20th century novel by William Bell Wright.

His audiobook production company, Punch Audio, publishes through Audible such titles as Paladins by Joel Rosenberg, Miracle at Merion: Ben Hogan's 1950 Comeback by David Barrett, I Am John Galt, These Precious Hours and Mulligan by Michael Corrigan, and Jesus: The Missing Years by Walter Parks. Other artists at Punch Audio include the British actor Ian Hart, and actresses Mary Jane Wells, Liane Curtis and Kate Huffman. They recently produced for Audible five novels by the late British author Alec Waugh including the novel Island in the Sun which was adapted into the 1957 hit film of the same name starring James Mason, Harry Belafonte and Joan Collins. Fellow actor friends Juliet Mills and Maxwell Caulfield voiced Love in These Days and My Brother Evelyn and Other Stories.

Personal life
Hyde-White was married to actress Karen Dotrice from 1986 until 1992. They have a son, Garrick. In 1997, he married Shelly Bovert; they have a son, Jackson, and reside in Santa Monica, California.

Filmography

References

External links 
 

1959 births
20th-century English male actors
21st-century English male actors
British expatriate male actors in the United States
English emigrants to the United States
English male film actors
English male television actors
English Presbyterians
Living people
Male actors from London
Male actors from Palm Springs, California
Male actors from Greater Los Angeles
Palm Springs High School people